Fumiyuki Beppu (born 10 April 1983) is a Japanese former professional road bicycle racer, who last rode for UCI WorldTeam . His older brother is the cyclist Takumi Beppu.

Career

Team Discovery (2005–2007)

In June 2006, Beppu was crowned the Japanese national champion in both the time trial and the road race.

On 28 September 2007, the  professional cycling team announced that they had signed Beppu for an initial one-year contract.

Skil-Shimano (2008–2009)
He won the Combativity award in the final 21st flat stage from Montereau-Fault-Yonne to Paris Champs-Élysées. He also placed 8th in stage 3 and 7th in stage 19. Along with Yukiya Arashiro, he became the first Japanese national to complete that race. Kisso Kawamuro and Daisuke Imanaka had started but not finished the race before.

RadioShack (2010–2011)
Later it became clear that Beppu still had one year left on his contract with Skil-Shimano, so he had to buy himself out of the contract. In February 2010 he finally started races with RadioShack at Omloop Het Nieuwsblad and Kuurne-Bruxelles-Kuurne.

GreenEdge (2012–2013)
In October 2011, it was announced that Beppu would ride for the new Australian based team . He participated in the men's road race at the 2012 Summer Olympics and finished in 22nd place. After two years with the team, Beppu left at the end of the 2013 season to join .

Trek Factory Racing (2014–2019)
He was named in the startlist for the 2016 Vuelta a España.

Major results

2000
 1st  Time trial, National Junior Road Championships
2001
 1st  Road race, Asian Junior Road Championships
 1st  Road race, National Junior Road Championships
2003
 1st  Road race, National Under-23 Road Championships
 1st Stage 1 Giro della Valle d'Aosta Mont Blanc
2004
 1st Stage 1 Giro della Valle d'Aosta Mont Blanc
 1st  Mountains classification Ronde de l'Isard
 3rd Overall Tour du Loir-et-Cher
2006
 National Road Championships
1st  Road race
1st  Time trial
 Asian Games
4th Time trial
9th Road race
2007
 10th Overall Driedaagse van West-Vlaanderen
2008
 1st  Road race, Asian Road Championships
2009
 1st  Mountains classification Route du Sud
  Combativity award Stage 21 Tour de France
2010
 4th Châteauroux Classic
 10th Overall Driedaagse van West-Vlaanderen
2011
 National Road Championships
1st  Road race
1st  Time trial
 6th Grand Prix d'Isbergues
 8th GP Ouest–France
2012
 1st Stage 2 (TTT) Eneco Tour
 2nd Japan Cup Criterium
2013
 5th Japan Cup Criterium
2014
 1st  Time trial, National Road Championships
 4th Time trial, Asian Games
2015
 1st Japan Cup Criterium
2016
 1st Japan Cup Criterium
 3rd  Road race, Asian Road Championships
  Combativity award Stage 18 Vuelta a España
2017
 2nd Road race, National Road Championships
 4th Road race, Asian Road Championships
2018
 Asian Road Championships
1st  Team time trial
2nd  Road race
4th Time trial
Asian Games
2nd  Road race
3rd  Time trial
2019
 3rd Time trial, National Road Championships

Grand Tour general classification results timeline

References

External links

 

1983 births
Living people
Japanese male cyclists
Cyclists at the 2008 Summer Olympics
Cyclists at the 2012 Summer Olympics
Olympic cyclists of Japan
People from Chigasaki, Kanagawa
Asian Games medalists in cycling
Cyclists at the 2006 Asian Games
Cyclists at the 2014 Asian Games
Cyclists at the 2018 Asian Games
Medalists at the 2018 Asian Games
Asian Games silver medalists for Japan
Asian Games bronze medalists for Japan